was a career officer in the Imperial Japanese Navy during World War II.
Aoki graduated from the 41st class of Naval Academy at Etajima in December 1913, ranking 90 out of 118 Cadets. His classmates included Ryūnosuke Kusaka, Masatomi Kimura and Raizō Tanaka. Aoki was promoted to captain in 1937, and was made commander of the seaplane tender . He subsequently served as commandant of the naval aviation training schools at Yokosuka and Tsuchiura.

On 25 April 1942, Aoki was made the captain of the aircraft carrier . He was in command of the ship at the time of her sinking at the Battle of Midway on 5 June 1942, and attempted to go down with his ship, but he was forcefully removed by his crew. After the battle, he applied to enter the reserves, but was instead sent to the garrison of Japanese-occupied Hainan, and made commander of the naval air group based at Haikou. He was subsequently recalled to Japan to command the Sasebo Air Group. Aoki was in command of the Genzan Air Group in Korea at the time of the surrender of Japan. On hearing of the surrender announcement, Aoki flew back to the Japanese home islands; however, the men left behind in Wonsan were captured by the Soviet Union and were sent to labor camps in Siberia, where many perished. Aoki died in 1962.

Known Assignments
Gunnery Officer, Aoba – 30 November 1929 – 1 November 1930
Equipping Officer, Takao – 1 November 1930 – 15 October 1931
Gunnery Officer, Kaga – 15 October 1931 – 20 October 1933
Executive Officer, Notoro – 20 October 1933 – 15 November 1934
Executive Officer, Kisarazu Air Group – 1 April 1936 – 1 December 1936
Executive Officer, Kaga – 1 December 1936 – 15 November 1937
Commanding Officer, Kinugasa Maru – 15 November 1937 – 28 April 1938
Chief Equipping Officer, Mizuho – 16 May 1938 – 25 February 1939
Commanding Officer, Mizuho – 25 February 1939 – 15 November 1939
Commanding Officer, Tsuchiura Air Group – 15 November 1940 – 25 April 1942
Commanding Officer, Akagi – 25 April 1942 – 5 June 1942
Staff Officer, Yokosuka Naval District – 25 July 1942 – 25 August 1942
Staff Officer, Kure Naval District – 25 August 1942 – 5 October 1942
Staff Officer, Yokosuka Naval District – 5 October 1942 – 1 November 1942
Staff Officer, Hainan Guard District – 1 November 1942 – 1 October 1943
Commanding Officer, Hainan Air Group – 1 October 1943 – 26 May 1944
Commanding Officer, Haikou Air Group – 1 October 1943 – 1 May 1944 (additional duty while Commanding Officer Hainan Air Group)
Commanding Officer, Oryu Air Group – 1 October 1943 – 1 May 1944 (additional duty while Commanding Officer Hainan Air Group)
Commanding Officer, Sasebo Air Group – 15 May 1944 – 15 December 1944
Commanding & Executive Officers, Genzan Air Group – 15 December 1944 – 15 August 1945

Promotions
Midshipman – 19 December 1913
Ensign – 1 December 1914
Sub-Lieutenant – 1 December 1916
Lieutenant – 1 December 1920
Lieutenant Commander – 1 December 1926
Commander – 1 December 1932
Captain – 1 December 1937

References

Year of birth missing
1967 deaths
Imperial Japanese Navy personnel of World War II
Imperial Japanese Navy officers
Battle of Midway